Julie Pinson (born November 7, 1967) is an American actress, best known for her work with soap operas.

Early life 
Pinson was born in Fremont, California. As a child, she was inspired by her mother, a classically trained opera singer, to get into acting. She attended Fremont Christian School, and graduated from Mission San Jose High School.

Career 
Pinson's best-known roles include Eve Lambert on Port Charles, Billie Reed on Days of Our Lives and Janet Ciccone on As the World Turns. Pinson also had a brief twelve-episode run as Shiloh on The Young and the Restless in 2004. She has also appeared on River Ridge as Kimberly Reeves.

Personal life
Pinson was engaged to fellow actor Billy Warlock, but they broke up shortly before their planned 1999 wedding. They reconnected in 2005 while working together on Days of our Lives and married in Las Vegas on August 26, 2006.

Filmography

Film

Television

Awards

Daytime Emmy Awards
 Outstanding Supporting Actress (2011) Nominated
 Outstanding Supporting Actress (2010) Won
 Outstanding Supporting Actress (2009) Nominated

Soap Opera Digest Awards
 Outstanding Supporting Actress (2000) Nominated
 Outstanding Younger Lead Actress (1999) Nominated

References

External links
 
Billie Reed character profile on SoapCentral
Eve Lambert character profile on SoapCentral
Port Charles's Eve Lambert character bio

1967 births
20th-century American actresses
21st-century American actresses
Actresses from California
American film actresses
American soap opera actresses
American television actresses
Daytime Emmy Award winners
Daytime Emmy Award for Outstanding Supporting Actress in a Drama Series winners
Living people
People from Fremont, California